Maganevka is a rural locality (a village) in Fyodorovsky Selsoviet, Fyodorovsky District, Bashkortostan, Russia. The population was 3 as of 2010. There is 1 street.

Geography 
Maganevka is located 18 km northeast of Fyodorovka (the district's administrative centre) by road. Gumbetovo is the nearest rural locality.

References 

Rural localities in Fyodorovsky District